Phaeographis is a genus of lichenized fungi in the family Graphidaceae. It has an estimated 180 species.

Species

Phaeographis amazonica 
Phaeographis asteroides 
Phaeographis atromaculata 
Phaeographis australiensis 
Phaeographis boquetensis 
Phaeographis caesiodisca 
Phaeographis caesiodiscoides 
Phaeographis caesiohians 
Phaeographis caesioradians 
Phaeographis ceratoides 
Phaeographis ceylonensis 
Phaeographis colligata 
Phaeographis decolorascens 
Phaeographis delicatula 
Phaeographis dendritica 
Phaeographis dividens 
Phaeographis elaeina 
Phaeographis epruinosa 
Phaeographis faurieana 
Phaeographis firmula 
Phaeographis flavescens 
Phaeographis fragilissima 
Phaeographis fujianensis 
Phaeographis fulgurata 
Phaeographis fumarprotocetrarica 
Phaeographis fusca 
Phaeographis girringunensis 
Phaeographis glaucoleucoides 
Phaeographis haloniata 
Phaeographis inusta 
Phaeographis kalbii 
Phaeographis laevigata 
Phaeographis lecanographa 
Phaeographis leiogrammodes 
Phaeographis lindigiana 
Phaeographis litoralis 
Phaeographis lobata 
Phaeographis loeiensis 
Phaeographis lyellii 
Phaeographis major 
Phaeographis multicolor 
Phaeographis nardiensis 
Phaeographis necopinata 
Phaeographis neotriconica 
Phaeographis neotricosa 
Phaeographis neotricosoides 
Phaeographis oricola 
Phaeographis oscitans 
Phaeographis phurueaensis 
Phaeographis platycarpa 
Phaeographis pleiospora 
Phaeographis pseudomelana 
Phaeographis pseudostromatica 
Phaeographis quadrifera 
Phaeographis radiata 
Phaeographis rhodoplaca 
Phaeographis rubrostroma 
Phaeographis salazinica 
Phaeographis sarcographoides 
Phaeographis scalpturata 
Phaeographis schizolomoides 
Phaeographis siamensis 
Phaeographis smithii 
Phaeographis spondaica 
Phaeographis striata 
Phaeographis subdividens 
Phaeographis subintricata 
Phaeographis subinusta 
Phaeographis subtigrina 
Phaeographis tuberculifera 
Phaeographis xanthonica

References

Graphidaceae
Lichen genera
Ostropales genera
Taxa named by Johannes Müller Argoviensis
Taxa described in 1882